Coffee production in Puerto Rico has a checkered history between the 18th century and the present. Output peaked during the Spanish colonial rule but slumped when the island was annexed by the United States in 1898. In recent years, the gourmet coffee trade has seen an exponential growth with many of the traditional coffee haciendas of the Spanish colonial period being revived. Puerto Rican coffee is characterized as smooth and sweet.

History
Coffee was first introduced to Puerto Rico in 1736 as a minor cash crop during Spanish colonial rule from nearby Martinique, and was mostly consumed locally. By the end of the 18th century, the island produced more than a million pounds of coffee a year. By the late 19th century, coffee production peaked, and the island was the world's seventh largest producer of coffee. Utuado was the most prominent site in coffee production before 1898. This rapid rise in the quantity and quality of coffee produced in the island is attributed to immigrants from Europe who brought their expertise to bear on its growth.

In 1898, the United States annexed the island from Spanish control, and it subsequently saw a decline in coffee production, as emphasis was more on growing sugar cane commercially. However, there is now a resurgence of coffee production, with the traditional hacienda estates reopening, and additional areas being brought under the crop. New coffee farms have been started in the Cordillera Central where the nutrient content in the volcanic soil is conducive to high value production of gourmet coffee.

Production
The main areas which produce coffee are in the municipalities of Yauco, Puerto Rico, Adjuntas,  San Sebastián, Lares and Las Marías in the northwestern central part of the country. In recent years, production has been affected by factors such as cloud cover, climate change, high cost of production, and the effects of political unrest. It is also reported that about half of the crop remains unpicked because pickers are not available.

Coffea arabica is the main species of coffee grown; popular varieties are Bourbon, Typica, Pacas and Catimor. The local consumption accounts for one third of the produce. Coffee from Dominican Republic and Mexico is also imported for commercial grade coffees for local consumption by fast foods and most small town cafeterias. The exported quantity is,  however, very limited.

References

Bibliography

External links
 All About Puerto Rico Coffee – History and Best Brands
 Types of coins that circulate in Puerto Rico (1508-2017)
 La Montaña - Yauco Ganador Taza de Oro de Puerto Rico 2019 - 2020  Gustos Reserva 

Puerto Rico
Agriculture in Puerto Rico
Puerto Rico

ko:푸에르토리코 요리